Admiral Thomas Bibb Hayward (May 3, 1924 – March 3, 2022) was Chief of Naval Operations for the United States Navy from July 1, 1978, until June 30, 1982, after which he retired from military service.

Naval career
Shortly after the commencement of World War II, Hayward enlisted in the U.S. Navy V-5 aviation program and was called to active duty as a naval aviation cadet in 1943, anticipating that he would shortly be flying combat in the South Pacific. However, when roughly halfway through the flight training syllabus, he competed for and was accepted to attend the United States Naval Academy at Annapolis, Maryland, to position himself for a career in the U.S. Navy at war's end. In 1949, he returned to flight training at Naval Air Station Pensacola, Florida, and received his United States Naval Aviator wings in July 1950. One of Hayward's squadron mates in VF-51 was future astronaut Neil Armstrong, who became his lifelong friend.

Following his Korean tour, Hayward became a Navy test pilot, a lead instructor in the forerunner to the Navy Fighter Weapons School, also known as TOPGUN, and Commanding Officer of VF-103. He also attended the Naval War College in 1958. In 1959 he was one of the 32 finalists for NASA Astronaut Group 1, but ultimately was not selected.

In 1967, he attended the National War College and obtained a master's degree in Foreign Affairs from George Washington University.

Hayward then had tours of duty as commander of the United States Seventh Fleet from 1975 to 1976, and then Commander in Chief of the United States Pacific Fleet from August 12, 1976, to May 9, 1978.

As Chief of Naval Operations, Hayward is best remembered for his "Pride in the Navy" priority: the emphasis on rebuilding readiness of both active and reserve forces; restoring priority in mine warfare; and his success in the zero tolerance "Not in my Navy" drug program.

In 1981, he was awarded the Society of Experimental Test Pilots James H. Doolittle Award. In January 2007, the United States Naval Academy Alumni Association announced Admiral Thomas B. Hayward as one of four recipients of its 2007 Distinguished Graduate Award.

Corporate career and retirement
After retirement from the Navy, his primary efforts were in the field of education, where he helped co-found companies focused on reading and math solutions K-12, masters and doctorates in education, and both domestic and international distance learning for college and higher ed. He also served on the board of advisors of the Code of Support Foundation, a nonprofit military services organization.

Death
Hayward died on March 3, 2022, at the age of 97 in Seattle, Washington.

Awards and decorations

References

1924 births
2022 deaths
United States Navy admirals
Chiefs of Naval Operations
United States Navy personnel of the Korean War
United States Navy personnel of the Vietnam War
American Korean War pilots
American Vietnam War pilots
United States Naval Aviators
American test pilots
Recipients of the Distinguished Flying Cross (United States)
Recipients of the Legion of Merit
Recipients of the Air Medal
United States Naval Academy alumni
People from Glendale, California
United States Navy personnel of World War II
Military personnel from California